2004 in philosophy

Events 
 Jürgen Habermas was awarded the Kyoto Prize in Arts and Philosophy for his "achievements in social philosophy, in particular [the] establishment of the communicative action theory and discourse ethics, and its application in practical activities for a public-minded ideal society".
 The Holberg Prize was inaugurated in 2004.

Publications 
 Harry G. Frankfurt, The Reasons of Love (2004)
 Seyla Benhabib, The Rights of Others (2004)
 Charles Larmore, The Practices of the Self (2004)
 Galen Strawson, Against Narrativity (2004)
 James Giles, The Nature of Sexual Desire (2004)

Philosophical literature 
 Pascal Mercier, Night Train to Lisbon (2004)

Deaths 
 May 9 - Alan Gewirth (born 1912)
 July 28 - Francis Crick (born 1916)
 October 9 - Jacques Derrida (born 1930)
 December 28 - Susan Sontag (born 1933)

References 

Philosophy
21st-century philosophy
Philosophy by year